Astrid Schirmer (born 8 November 1942) is a German operatic soprano and an academic teacher. She sang mostly dramatic parts at major German opera houses and appeared at the Bayreuth Festival.

Career 
Schirmer studied voice at the Musikhochschule Berlin with Johanna Rakow and Elisabeth Grümmer. She made her debut at the Landestheater Coburg in 1967 as Senta in Wagner's Der fliegende Holländer. She was a member of the Staatsoper Hannover, the Essen Opera and the Nationaltheater Mannheim.

Her roles were mostly leading parts as a dramatic soprano, such as Leonore in Beethoven's Fidelio and Wagner's Sieglinde in Die Walküre, Brünnhilde in Siegfried, and both Elisabeth and Venus in Tannhäuser. She also appeared in Verdi operas, in the title role of Aida, as Amelia in Un ballo in maschera, and as Leonore in La forza del destino. She performed the title roles of Ariadne auf Naxos and Arabella by Richard Strauss, and of Puccini's Tosca and Turandot. At the Staatsoper Hannover, she appeared as Miss Wingrave in Britten's Owen Wingrave, conducted by George Alexander Albrecht, with Gerhard Faulstich in the title role.  A versatile singer, she also appeared as Donna Anna in Mozart's Don Giovanni, Santuzza in Mascagni's Cavalleria rusticana, Bess in Gershwin's Porgy and Bess, and Lady Billows in Britten's Albert Herring. She also sang concerts and oratorios.

Schirmer sang as a guest at major opera houses in Germany such as the Deutsche Oper Berlin, Deutsche Oper am Rhein, the Frankfurt Opera, the Cologne Opera and the Stuttgart State Opera Stuttgart. She performed at the Teatro Liceo in Barcelona and the Zurich Opera.

She appeared at the Bayreuth Festival, in 1977 as Ortlinde in Wagner's Die Walküre, and in 1978 in the same work in the leading part of Sieglinde. Both performances were part of the production Jahrhundertring, staged by Patrice Chéreau and conducted by Pierre Boulez.

Schirmer was awarded the title Kammersängerin in Mannheim on 7 July 1981, together with Michael Davidson and Franz Mazura. She has been a voice teacher at the Musikhochschule Hannover. Among her students was Daniel Eggert.

References

External links 
 Astrid Schirmer wird 70 (in German) Online Merker 8 November 2012

German operatic sopranos
Living people
1942 births
Berlin University of the Arts alumni